Life support is a set of therapies for preserving a patient's life when essential body systems are not functioning sufficiently to sustain life.

Life support may also refer to:

In reality
 Advanced cardiac life support, urgent treatment for life-threatening emergencies
 Basic life support, prehospital care provided by trained responders
 Life support (aviation), the field centered on ensuring the safety of aircrew
 Life-support system, the technologies used in human spaceflight, saturation diving and crewed submersibles

In entertainment 
 "Life Support" (Star Trek: Deep Space Nine), third-season episode of Star Trek: Deep Space Nine
 Life Support (Australian TV series), Australian television comedy
 Life Support (British TV series), a 1999 British medical drama
 Life Support (film), 2007 movie
 A song in the Jonathan Larson musical Rent
 Life Support (Air Supply album), 1979
 Life Support (Madison Beer album), 2021
"Life Support" (song), by YoungBoy Never Broke Again, 2021